Rhytidiadelphus triquetrus, the big shaggy-moss or rough goose neck moss, is a species of moss in the family Hylocomiaceae. It is often the dominating moss species in moderately rich forest habitats in the boreal regions and the Pacific Northwest. Because of its fuzzy appearance and tail-like shape it is also called the 'electrified cat's tail moss'. Not to be confused with square goose-necked moss, Rhytidiadelphus squarrosus.

Ecology
Terrestrial on humus-rich substrates in montane forests. Occasionally grows on logs and trees in lowland rainforests or on sandy-gravelly soils near streams.

Response to herbicide application
In a study of the effect of the herbicide Asulam on moss growth, Rhytidiadelphus triquetrus was shown to have intermediate sensitivity to Asulam exposure.

References

External links
Rhytidiadelphus triquetrus in the Bryophyte Flora of North America

Hypnales
Flora of Bulgaria
Plants described in 1801